was a prominent figure during the Muromachi period and the beginning of the Sengoku period. She was daughter to Hino Shigemasa and was the official wife of Ashikaga Yoshimasa, the eighth shōgun of the Ashikaga shogunate (at first Tomiko was betrothed to Ashikaga Yoshikatsu the seventh shōgun but Yoshikatsu died at the age of 10), and the mother of Ashikaga Yoshihisa, the ninth shōgun. Her efforts during the succession dispute are seen as one of the causes of the Ōnin War and led to the beginning of the Sengoku period.

Early life 
Hino Tomiko was born into the Hino family, a powerful family whose women became consorts to many previous Shoguns. These familial connections enhanced the Hino's power to control the Shogunate Court. Tomiko was important to strengthen the Hino family relationship with the Shogunate and grow ever more powerful. When Tomiko's social and political status emerged after her marriage to Ashikaga Yoshimasa, she decided to stay active in the shogunal government. She had her first child on the ninth day of the first month of 1459, however, the child died the same day. Later she placed the blame for the child's death on Yoshimasa's wet nurse, Imamairi no Tsubone, later exiled to Oki Island on Lake Biwa where she committed suicide.

Ōnin War 
In 1460, Yoshimasa decided to abdicate his position as Shogun. However, since Tomiko had not given birth to an heir, Yoshimasa convinced his younger brother Ashikaga Yoshimi to succeed him, first in office and then gradually claiming the title of Shogun. Tomiko was against it, although at the time she had no influence to contest Yoshimi's appointment, she stood at war with the shogunate officers and decided to rule until the birth of an heir.  When she gave birth to the future Ashikaga Yoshihisa made her the mother of the future shogun. Tomiko went looking for military support to make sure the next successor was from her family lineage. She got support from the Ouchi, Hatakeyama, Shiba and others clans.

With her standing in the Hino family, and backed by Yamana Sozen, two clans developed in the capital, Hosokawa clan supporting the newly appointed Shogun, Yoshimi, and the Yamana clan the succession of Yoshihisa. Thus, this desire of Tomiko to place her son in line for the succession led to the Ōnin War.

After the Onin War 
In 1489, Yoshihisa died while making an expedition to subdue Rokkaku Takayori, which was followed by Yoshimasa's death. So Ashikaga Yoshitane, who was the son of Yoshimi and Tomiko's younger sister, was nominated for the shogun by Tomiko. But Yoshimi rebelled against Tomiko's decision. He demolished Tomiko's residence and seized her territory. After Yoshimi's death, Yoshiki also rebelled against Tomiko, following his late father's will. In 1493, however, Tomiko carried out a coup with the help of Hosokawa Masamoto, dethroning Yoshiki and instead installing Ashikaga Yoshizumi, who was Yoshimasa's nephew and the son of Ashikaga Masatomo, the Horigoe-Kubo as shogun. But her life ended in 1496. She died at the age of 57.

Legacy 
Hino Tomiko is sometimes said to have been an evil millionairess and a bad wife, but her ability surely supported the shogunate's finances, so one may have to consider that her bad reputation has been influenced by the tendency of later generations to have come to look down on women and merchant activities. Meanwhile, particularly in recent years, some female historians and writers, influenced by feminism, have come to describe Tomiko as a capable female politician different from the exaggerated image. Either way, it can be said that she is a difficult figure to evaluate fairly.

A grave at the Kekai-in Temple, in Kamigyo Ward of Kyoto City is said to be Tomiko's. A wooden statue of Tomiko is owned by the Hokyoji Temple, also in Kamigyo Ward.

In popular culture

 She has been the subject of novels by Ryōtarō Shiba and Michiko Nagai.
 She was also the subject of a novel named Fuyu No Rakijatsu by Eri Kawamaru.
 Hino Tomiko was a central character in the NHK Taiga drama Hana no Ran.

References

External links
 Samurai Archives: Hino Tomiko

See also 

 Onna-bugeisha

 List of female castellans in Japan

1440 births
1496 deaths
People of Muromachi-period Japan
15th-century Japanese women
15th-century politicians
Japanese women in warfare
Japanese women in politics
15th-century Japanese women writers
15th-century Japanese poets